Mary Gardner Belk (born October 5, 1956 ) is a  Democratic member of the North Carolina General Assembly representing the state's eighty-eighth House district, which includes portions of Southeast Mecklenburg County.  2017 was her first year in North Carolina House. In the 2017–2018 session, Belk served on the Transportation, Banking, and Justice and Public Safety Appropriations Committees.

Personal life

Family
Representative Belk lives in Charlotte, North Carolina. She and her husband, Ralph Belk Jr., have four adult children. Her oldest son, Ralph Belk III, serves as her legislative assistant.

Education
Belk graduated from Garinger High School in 1974 and studied police science before dedicating time to raising her children. She later returned to the University of North Carolina at Charlotte and earned her BA in political science, graduating with honors in 2006.

Public service
Before seeking elective office, Belk served on a number of community Boards, including the Dilworth Community Development Association, the Charlotte Catholic Foundation, the St. Patrick's Church Council, and the Democratic Women of Mecklenburg County.

Cancer diagnosis
In September 2016, during her first campaign, Belk was diagnosed with breast cancer and underwent surgery to immediately begin treatment. A positive prognosis allowed her to postpone chemotherapy  until two days after the 2016 election, and she underwent radiation treatments during her first months serving in the General Assembly. Her office announced that she completed her final radiation treatment on May 18, 2017.

North Carolina House of Representatives

Committee assignments

2021-2022 Session
Appropriations
Appropriations - Transportation
Judiciary IV
Regulatory Reform
Transportation

2019-2020 session
Appropriations
Appropriations - Health and Human Services
Judiciary IV
Regulatory Reform
Transportation

2017-2018 session
Appropriations
Appropriations - Justice and Public Safety
Judiciary IV
Transportation
Banking
State and Local Government I

Electoral history

2020

2018

2016

References

External links
North Carolina General Assembly – Representative Mary Belk
Project Vote Smart - Rep. Mary Belk
Follow the Money - Rep. Mary Belk
MaryBelk.com Official Campaign Page

Living people
Women state legislators in North Carolina
1956 births
21st-century American politicians
Democratic Party members of the North Carolina House of Representatives
People from Washington, D.C.
21st-century American women politicians